Yasushi is a masculine Japanese given name.

Possible writings
Yasushi can be written using many different combinations of kanji characters. Here are some examples:

康, "healthy"
靖, "peaceful"
泰, "peaceful"
安, "tranquil"
靖志, "peaceful, determination"
靖史, "peaceful, history"
靖士, "peaceful, knight"
靖司, "peaceful, administer"
康志, "healthy, determination"
康史, "healthy, history"
康士, "healthy, knight"
安志, "tranquil, determination"
安史, "tranquil, history"
安士, "tranquil, knight"
安司, "tranquil, administer"
保志, "preserve, determination"
保史, "preserve, history"
保士, "preserve, knight"
泰志, "peaceful, determination"
泰史, "peaceful, history"
易司, "divination, administer"
妥師, "peace, teacher"
也寸志, "to be, measurement, determination"

The name can also be written in hiragana やすし or katakana ヤスシ.

Notable people with the name
, Japanese politician
, Japanese diplomat
, Japanese television writer, lyricist and academic
, Japanese composer and conductor
, Japanese video game composer
, Japanese footballer
, Japanese footballer
, Japanese politician
, Japanese volleyball player
, Japanese writer
, Japanese musician
, Japanese baseball player
, Japanese professional wrestler
, Japanese politician
, Japanese architect
, Japanese footballer
, Japanese footballer
, Japanese businessman and banker
, Japanese footballer
, Japanese rower
, Japanese photographer
, Japanese entomologist
, Japanese illustrator and character designer
, Japanese samurai and politician
, Japanese musician
, Japanese film director
, Japanese photographer
, Japanese painter
, Japanese speed skater
, Japanese sumo wrestler
, Japanese theoretical physicist
, Japanese artist
, Japanese baseball player
, Japanese professional wrestler
, Japanese anthropologist
Yasushi Yamaguchi, Japanese video game designer and artist
, Japanese footballer and manager

Fictional characters
Yasushi Takagi (高木 泰士), from manga Nana

See also
6922 Yasushi, a main-belt asteroid

Japanese masculine given names